Antodice venustula is a species of beetle in the family Cerambycidae. It was described by Lane in 1973.

References

Antodice
Beetles described in 1973